Salignac may refer to:

People

 Eugene de Salignac (1861–1943), American photographer 
 Eustase Thomas-Salignac, French tenor
 François de Salignac de la Mothe-Fénelon (missionary)  (1641–1679), Sulpician missionary in New France
 François Louis de Salignac marquis de La Mothe-Fénelon (1722–1767), French soldier, governor of Martinique from 1763 to 1764
 Giraut de Salignac, jongleur and troubadour from the Quercy
 Mélanie de Salignac (1744–1766), blind French woman whose achievements were mentioned in the accounts of Diderot

Places
 Salignac, Alpes-de-Haute-Provence, a commune in the Alpes-de-Haute-Provence department of France
 Salignac, Gironde, in the Gironde department
 Salignac-de-Mirambeau, in the Charente-Maritime department
 Salignac-Eyvigues, in the Dordogne department
 Salignac-sur-Charente, in the Charente-Maritime department